Stéphane Bullion (born in 1980) is a French Etoile dancer of the Paris Opera Ballet.

Stéphane Bullion started dance at age eleven and entered the Paris Opera Ballet school at age fourteen (1994). He joined the corps de ballet in 1997. During his school years, he danced twice at the School annual show (1996 and 1997), in Serge Lifar's "Le Chevalier et la demoiselle" and George Balanchine's Western Symphony. 
He became Coryphée in 2001, Sujet in 2002 and Premier danseur in 2007.
 
He has been appointed Etoile, the highest grade of the company, in 2010 after his performance of Solor in Rudolf Nureyev’s version of La Bayadère.

Career

He danced the Faun in Vaslav Nijinsky's L'après-midi d'un faune based on Claude Debussy's Prélude à l'après-midi d'un faune while still a Coryphée in 2001 and has been chosen by Yury Grigorovich in 2004 for the title role of Ivan, in Ivan the Terrible. 
Cast at first in villain's roles in the Rudolf Nureyev's versions of classics where they are major roles (Abderam in Raymonda, Tybalt in Romeo and Juliet or Rothbart in Swan Lake), his promotion to Premier danseur in 2007 gave him access to romantic roles like Armand in John Neumeier’s The Lady of the Camellias, Jean de Brienne in  Nureyev’s Raymonda or Albrecht in Bart’s version of Corrali-Perrot’s staging of Giselle.  While still favouring these main roles in Nureyev's repertoire after he reached the status of Etoile, he dances Siegfried in Swan Lake or Lucien d'Hervilly in Pierre Lacotte’s Paquita as well.
 
A tall and powerful dancer, he has, since the beginning of his career, often been chosen by choreographers to create or introduce their ballets in Paris Opera Ballet’s repertoire.
  
World creations: AndréAuria (Edouard Lock - 2002), MC14/22, Ceci est mon corps (2004), Ananda, Siddharta (2009) (Angelin Preljocaj), Répliques (2009) and Sept mètres et de mi au-dessus des montagnes (2017) (Nicolas Paul), Eros, Psyché, (Alexei Ratmansky - 2011), Vaudémont (the prince) in The Nutcracker (Sidi Larbi Cherkaoui, Edouard Lock and Arthur Pita) in Iolanta-The Nutcracker directed by Dmitri Tcherniakov, 2016, Play (Alexander Ekman - 2017)

Creations on Paris stage: Morel (Proust or the heart's intermissions - Roland Petit- 2007), L’homme (The House of Bernarda - Mats Ek - 2008), l’Ame - (Third Symphony of Gustav Mahler-John Neumeier - 2009),  Mikado (Kaguyahime - Jiří Kylián - 2010), Die Grosse Fuge (Anne Teresa de Keersmaeker- 2015), Die Verklärte Nacht (Anne Teresa de Keersmaeker- 2015), Polyphonia (Christopher Wheeldon- 2015), Titania's cavalier A Midsummer Night's Dream - George Balanchine

Stéphane Bullion is a favourite of Roland Petit (Proust or the heart's intermissions, Le Loup, L’Arlésienne, Le Jeune Homme et la Mort, Carmen, Notre-Dame de Paris ), Angelin Preljocaj (MC14/22, Le Songe de Médée, Siddharta, Le Parc), Nicolas Le Riche (Caligula),  John Neumeier (The Lady of the Camellias, The Third Symphony of Gustav Mahler), etc.

Acknowledged as a fine partner, he danced with Paris Opera Ballet guests from Russian companies in Rudolf Nureyev's ballets: With Svetlana Zakharova from Bolshoi Ballet in La Bayadère as Solor and in Swan Lake pas de de trois as Rothbart. He also partnered Maria Alexandrova from Bolshoi Ballet in Raymonda as Abderam and Ulyana Lopatkina from Mariinsky Ballet as Rothbart in Swan Lake. With Lyon Opera Ballet, he danced Don José in Roland Petit Carmen with Polina Semionova (American Ballet Theatre and Staatsballett Berlin)

International invitations: In 2007, French choreographer Jean-Guillaume Bart asked him to dance Conrad, the main role in le Corsaire for the creation of his reconstitution of the ballet in Yekaterinburg (Russia).
Additionally, as international guest in various ballet companies, he has been invited by the choreographer Yury Grigorovich to dance Ivan, in Ivan the terrible at the Mariinsky Theatre with the Kremlin ballet in 2005.
Other invitations includes Jerome Robbins In the Night in 2013 at the Teatro dell'Opera di Roma where he danced the main role in Le Parc by Angelin Preljocaj in 2016 and Roland Petit Le Jeune Homme et la Mort in 2017. Stéphane Bullion is also touring with the Roman company with Le Jeune Homme et la Mort.
 
In Austria, he danced Prince Siegfried in Rudolf Nureyev Swan Lake at the Vienna State Opera in 2015 with Royal Ballet principal dancer Marianela Núñez.

French photographer Anne  Deniau has elaborated a project around Stéphane Bullion dancing on a beach 24 hours in a row which resulted in a bilingual book and a film in 2012, 24 hours in a man's life.

He is Chevalier of Arts and Letters

Repertoire

Main roles (Paris Opera Ballet) :

George Balanchine : Agon, Brahms-Schoenberg Quartet, Concerto Barocco, Jewels, The Four Temperaments, A Midsummer Night's Dream, Symphony in C, La Valse, Stravinsky Violin Concerto
Patrice Bart : La Petite danseuse de Degas
Pina Bausch : Orpheus und Eurydike, Rites of Spring
Maurice Béjart :  L'Oiseau de feu, Le Mandarin merveilleux, Le Boléro
Kader Belarbi :  Wuthering Heights
Rafael Bonachela : AB [Intra] 
Sidi Larbi Cherkaoui, Edouard Lock and Arthur Pita : The Nutcracker in Iolanta-The Nutcracker directed by Dmitri Tcherniakov
Carolyn Carlson : Signes
Dimitri Chamblas and Boris Charmatz : À bras-le-corps
John Cranko : Onegin (Cranko)
Birgit Cullberg : Miss Julie
Nacho Duato : White Darkness
Jean Coralli and Jules Perrot : GiselleMats Ek : Apartment, The House of BernardaAlexander Ekman : PlayYury Grigorovich : Ivan the TerribleMarco Goecke : Dogs SleepAnne Teresa De Keersmaeker : Die Grosse Fuge, Verklärte NachtJiří Kylián : Doux Mensonges, Kaguyahime, Symphony of psalmsPierre Lacotte : Paquita ; The Red and the BlackSol León and Paul Lightfoot : Sleight of hand 
Nicolas Le Riche : CaligulaSerge Lifar : Les Mirages; Suite en blanc, PhèdreÉdouard Lock : AndréAuriaMichel Fokine : PetrouchkaKenneth MacMillan : L'histoire de Manon,  MayerlingJosé Martinez : Children of ParadiseVaslav Nijinsky : L'après-midi d'un fauneJohn Neumeier :  The Lady of the Camellias; The Third Symphony of Gustav MahlerRudolf Nureyev : La Bayadère ; Cinderella ; Don Quixote ; Swan Lake; The Sleeping Beauty  ; Raymonda ; Romeo and Juliet
Nicolas Paul : Répliques, Sept mètres et demi au-dessus des montagnes
Roland Petit : L'Arlésienne  ; Proust or the heart's intermissions ; Le Loup ; Le Jeune Homme et la Mort ; Carmen ; Notre-Dame de Paris (The Hunchback of Notre-Dame)
Angelin Preljocaj : Le Parc, Le Songe de Médée; MC 14/22 "ceci est mon corps"; Siddharta
Alexei Ratmansky : Psyché
Jerome Robbins : Afternoon of a faun; Glass Pieces;  In the Night, Fancy Free
Christopher Wheeldon : Polyphonia

Filmography

Documentary
Serge Lifar Musagète - Dominique Delouche, 2005
Serge Peretti : Le Dernier Italien - Dominique Delouche (DVD Etoiles pour l'exemple n°3)
La Danse (documentary directed by Frederick Wiseman), 2009
 Agnès Letestu : L'Apogée d'une étoile - Marlène Ionesco, 2013 (Delange Productions)

Movie 
Aurore - Nils Tavernier, 2006
24 hours in a man's life - Anne Deniau, 2012

Paris Opera Ballet 
MC14/22 "Ceci est mon corps" - Angelin Preljocaj (Opus Arte-2004)
Proust ou les intermittences du cœur - Roland Petit (Bel Air Classiques-2007)
La Dame aux camélias - John Neumeier (Opus Arte-2008)
Hommage à Jerome Robbins- Jerome Robbins (Bel Air Classiques-2008) 
Siddharta -Angelin Preljocaj (Arthaus Muzik-2010)
Caligula - Nicolas Le Riche (Idéale Audience-2011) 
Third Symphony of Gustav Mahler - John Neumeier (CLC Productions-2013)
L'histoire de Manon - Kenneth MacMillan (2015)
Anne Teresa De Keersmaeker à l'Opéra de Paris - Die Grosse Fuge & Verklärte Nacht (Idéale Audience-2015)
Iolanta - The Nutcracker directed by Dmitri Tcherniakov, choreography by Sidi Larbi Cherkaoui, Edouard Lock and Arthur Pita (Bel Air Media-2016)
A Midsummer Night's Dream - George Balanchine (Telmondis-2017)
 Play - Alexander Ekman (Bel Air Media, 2017)
 Thierrée/Shechter/Pérez/Pite - The Male Dancer d'Iván Pérez (Bel Air Media 2018)
 Hommage à Jerome Robbins - Fancy Free  (Telmondis, 2018)
 Gala inaugural des 350 ans de l'Opéra de Paris - Carmen (Roland Petit)  and The Lady of the Camellias (John Neumeier) - pas de deux with Eleonora Abbagnato (Bel Air Media, 2018)
 Gala d'ouverture de la saison de danse - "In The Night" (Jerome Robbins) (Opéra National de Paris, 2021)
 Notre-Dame de Paris - Roland Petit - (Telmondis and Opéra National de Paris, 2021)
 Roméo et Juliette - Rudolf Nureyev - (La Belle Télé and Opéra National de Paris, 2021)
 Le Rouge et le Noir - Pierre Lacotte (Telmondis, 2021)

References 
Books
 Elina Brotherus, Etudes d'après modèles, danseurs. Paris, éditions Textuel, Opéra de Paris, 2007, 64 p.
 Anne Deniau, 24 hours in a man's life. Anyway Editions, 2011, 96 p.

Articles
 Nureyev's Bayadère confirms new male star

External links 
Paris Opera Ballet:
Stéphane Bullion
Casting in soloist roles 

French male ballet dancers
Chevaliers of the Ordre des Arts et des Lettres
Paris Opera Ballet étoiles
Living people
1980 births